Kusaina is a village in Salarpur block, Budaun district, Uttar Pradesh, India. The village is administrated by Titauli Gram panchayat. The village code is 128264. According to 2011 Census of India, the total population of the village is 743, out of 386 are males and 357 are females.

References

Villages in Budaun district